Alakada Reloaded is a 2017 Nigerian comedy film by Nigerian actress and filmmaker Toyin Abraham. The film is the third part of the popular Alakada franchise, the former two being Alakada and Alakada 2.

The film depicts a young girl who, having come from a less-privileged family, makes a habit of lying to people about her financial status.

Alakada Reloaded was a huge commercial success in cinemas upon release, and part of the list of highest-grossing Nigerian films, having garnered a domestic gross of up to 70 million naira.

References 

2017 comedy films
Nigerian comedy films
2017 films